Fariborz Danesh (born 21 March 1963) is an Iranian taekwondo practitioner. He competed in the men's finweight at the 1988 Summer Olympics.

References

External links
 

1963 births
Place of birth missing (living people)
Living people
Iranian male taekwondo practitioners
Olympic taekwondo practitioners of Iran
Taekwondo practitioners at the 1988 Summer Olympics
World Taekwondo Championships medalists